Justice Goddard may refer to:

Luther Marcellus Goddard (1840–1917), associate justice of the Colorado Supreme Court
O. F. Goddard (1853–1943), associate justice of the Montana Supreme Court
Rayner Goddard, Baron Goddard (1877–1971), Lord Chief Justice of England